The 1992 Dunedin mayoral election was part of the New Zealand local elections held that same year. In 1992, elections were held for the Mayor of Dunedin plus other local government positions including twelve city councillors. The polling was conducted using the standard first-past-the-post electoral method.

Background
Mayor Richard Walls was re-elected, seeing off a high-profile challenge from former cricketer Stephen Boock, who was elected to the council for the Southern ward.

Results
The following table shows the results for the election:

References

Mayoral elections in Dunedin
Dunedin
Politics of Dunedin
1990s in Dunedin
October 1992 events in New Zealand